The 2023 Oklahoma Sooners softball team is an American college softball team that represents the University of Oklahoma during the 2023 NCAA Division I softball season. The Sooners are led by Patty Gasso in her twenty-ninth season, and play their home games at OU Softball Complex. They compete in the Big 12 Conference.

Previous season
The Sooners finished the 2022 season 59–3 overall, and 17–1 in the Big 12, finishing in first place in their conference. Following the conclusion of the regular season, the Sooners received an at-large bid to the 2022 NCAA Division I softball tournament, where they were the No. 1 overall seed. During the NCAA tournament they defeated Texas A&M in the regional finals and UCF in the super regionals. They won the 2022 Women's College World Series over Texas.

Preseason
Oklahoma lost two students to the transfer portal, utility player Turiya Coleman to Houston and outfielder Mackenzie Donihoo to Tennessee. Oklahoma added four transfer students, Michigan pitcher Alex Storako, Texas A&M catcher and infielder Haley Lee, and Arizona State infielders Cydney Sanders and Alynah Torres.

Oklahoma was ranked No. 1 in the nation in the preseason polls by NFCA/USA Today, ESPN.com/USA Softball, D1Softball and Softball America.

Award watch lists

Roster

Schedule

Rankings

References

Oklahoma
Oklahoma Softball
Oklahoma Sooners softball seasons